Wendling may refer to:

Places
 Wendling, Grieskirchen, Upper Austria, Austria
 Wendling, Braunau am Inn, in Kirchberg bei Mattighofen, Upper Austria, Austria
 Wendling, Salzburg, in Seekirchen am Wallersee, Austria
 Wendling, Norfolk, England
 Wendling railway station
 RAF Wendling, a former World War II airfield in Norfolk
 Wendling, California, a former town in California
 Wendling, Oregon, a former town in Oregon

Family name
 Dorothea Wendling (1736–1811), wife of Johann Baptist
 Elisabeth Wendling (1746–1786), German soprano
 Isabelle Wendling (born 1971), French handball player
 Jean Wendling (born 1934), French footballer
 Johann Baptist Wendling (1723–1797), German flutist and composer, husband of Dorothea
 John Wendling (born 1983), American football player
 Karl Wendling (1875–1962), German violinist
  (1857–1918), German pianist
 Pete Wendling (1888–1974), American composer and pianist